McCarthy Ofori (born 3 May 2005) is a Ghanaian professional footballer who plays as a defender for Ghanaian Premier League side Techiman Eleven Wonders FC. He is also a member of the Ghana national under-20 football team.

Career

Techiman Eleven Wonders 
Ofori began his career in the Ghana Premier league with Bono-side Techiman Eleven Wonders, making his debut in the 2020–21 Ghana Premier League at the age of 15 years. He made his professional debut on 3 January 2021 in a 1–0 loss match against International Allies, coming on a substitute for Prince Baffoe in the 85th minute.

References 

Living people
2005 births
Association football defenders
Ghanaian footballers
Ghana Premier League players
Ghana youth international footballers
Techiman Eleven Wonders FC players